Wermers is a surname. Notable people with the surname include:

Nicole Wermers (born 1971), German artist
Stevie Wermers (born 1966), American story artist and director

See also
Wemmers